The non-marine mollusks of Bhutan are a part of the molluscan fauna of Bhutan (wildlife of Bhutan). A number of species of non-marine mollusks are found in the wild in Bhutan.

Freshwater gastropods

Amnicolidae
 Erhaia jannei Gittenberger & Stelbrink, 2020
 Erhaia norbui Gittenberger, Gyeltshen & Stelbrink, 2022
 Erhaia pelkiae Gittenberger & Gyeltshen, 2020
 Erhaia wangchuki Gittenberger, Sherub & Stelbrink, 2017

Pomatiopsidae
 Tricula montana (Benson, 1843)

Viviparidae
 Bellamya bengalensis (Lamarck, 1822)

Pachychilidae
 Brotia costula (Rafinesque, 1833)

Paludomidae
 Paludomus conica (Gray, 1833)

Thiaridae
 Melanoides tuberculata (Müller, 1774)
 Thiara granifera (Lamarck, 1822)
 Thiara lineata (Gray, 1828)
 Thiara scabra (Müller, 1774)

Lymnaeidae
 Galba truncatula (Müller, 1774)
 Radix acuminata (Lamarck, 1822)
 Radix andersoniana (Nevill, 1881)

Planorbidae
 Gyraulus rotula (Benson, 1850)
 Gyraulus sivalensis (Clessin, 1884)

Land gastropods

Helicarionidae
 Rahula kleini Gittenberger, Leda & Sherub, 2017
 Rahula trongsaensis Gittenberger, Leda & Sherub, 2017

Pupinidae
 Pseudopomatias barnai Gittenberger, Leda, Sherub & Gyeltshen, 2019
 Pseudopomatias prestoni Páll-Gergely, 2015
 Schistoloma funiculalum (Benson, 1838)
 Streptaulus blanfordi Benson, 1857

Plectopylidae
 Endothyrella bhutanensis Gittenberger, Leda, Sherub & Páll-Gergely, 2018
 Endothyrella blanda (Gude, 1898)
 Endothyrella pemagatshel Gittenberger, Leda, Sherub & Páll-Gergely, 2018
 Endothyrella spirostriata Gittenberger, Leda, Sherub & Páll-Gergely, 2018

Clausiliidae
 Cylindrophaedusa parvula Gittenberger & Leda, 2019
 Cylindrophaedusa tenzini Gittenberger & Sherub, 2019
 Phaedusa adrianae Gittenberger & Leda, 2019
 Phaedusa bhutanensis Nordsieck, 1974
 Phaedusa chimiae Gittenberger & Sherub, 2019
 Phaedusa sangayae Gittenberger & Leda, 2019

Endodontidae
 Philalanka bhutana Gittenberger, Gyeltshen & Sherub, 2021

Euconulidae
 Sculpteuconulus obliquistriatus Gittenberger, Gyeltshen & Sherub, 2021

Agriolimacidae
 Deroceras laeve (O. F. Müller, 1774)

Vertiginidae
 Truncatellina bhutanensis Gittenberger, Leda & Sherub, 2013

Carychiidae
 Carychium indicum Benson, 1849

Freshwater bivalves

See also

Lists of molluscs of surrounding countries:
 List of non-marine molluscs of China
 List of non-marine molluscs of India

References

Molluscs
Bhutan
Bhutan